Nana Oye Lithur is a Ghanaian barrister and politician. She was the Minister for Gender, Children and Social Protection in Ghana from 2013 to 2017, appointed by President John Mahama after the Ghanaian general election. She is a member of the National Democratic Congress.

Biography 
She was educated at the Ridge Church School and Wesley Girls' High School. She received a Bachelor of Law from the University of Ghana, Legon, and a Masters in Law, Human Rights and Democratization in Africa from the University of Pretoria, South Africa.

She has held the positions of  executive director of the Human Rights Advocacy Centre as well as the Regional Coordinator (Africa Office) for the Commonwealth Human Rights Initiative. She has served as a member of the steering committee of the International Consortium on Medical Abortion and an advisory member of the International Consortium on Realising Reproductive Rights.

Awards and honours 

 Recipient of the African Servant Leadership Award (2011)
 Champion of Women's Rights Award (2012)
 West African Women in Leadership Award for Distinguished Impact

See also
List of Mahama government ministers
National Democratic Congress

References

Living people
Year of birth missing (living people)
Government ministers of Ghana
National Democratic Congress (Ghana) politicians
21st-century Ghanaian lawyers
Ghanaian women lawyers
People educated at Wesley Girls' Senior High School
University of Ghana alumni
Ridge Church School alumni
University of Pretoria alumni